Prince Igor ( is a screen version of the eponymous opera by Alexander Borodin based on the epic poem "The Lay of Igor's Host". The film was directed by Roman Tikhomirov, and shot at the Lenfilm Studios in 1969.

Synopsis 
The film, which is set in the 12th century, follows Prince Igor's campaign against the Polovtsians.

Reception 
The New York Times noted that although "as a movie, “Prince Igor” naturally is not standard screen fare", "it entertainingly succeeds in avoiding the static, stagy look of many previously filmed operas."

The singing and the dancing were also praised. Harlow Robinson in the Opera Quarterly: "The vocal cast contains two real stars—Nesterenko (Khan Konchak) and Milashkina (Yaroslavna)—both of whom turn in soulful, resonant performances that shine through the less than ideal sound quality. That same high performance level is maintained by the rest of the cast. "

References

External links 

The Lay of Igor's Campaign and the Works It Has Inspired

1969 films
Lenfilm films
1960s Russian-language films
Soviet opera films
Films set in the 12th century